The Unknown is a 1936 German drama film directed by  Frank Wisbar and starring Sybille Schmitz, Jean Galland and Ilse Abel. The film's sets were designed by the art directors Benno von Arent and Artur Günther. Location shooting took place around Berlin, Stuttgart and Dinkelsbühl in Bavaria. It was inspired by the Unknown Woman of the Seine and based on a novel by Reinhold Conrad Muschler.

Cast
 Sybille Schmitz as Madeleine
 Jean Galland as Thomas Bentick
 Ilse Abel as Evelyn – seine Braut
 Edwin Jürgensen as Ministerialrat van Altendorf
 F.W. Schröder-Schrom as Gieseking – Großindustrieller
 Aribert Mog as Gerhard – sein Sohn
 Lotte Spira as Hausdame bei Bentick
 Karl Platen as Diener bei Platen
 Karel Stepanek as Manager at Regina's
 Karin Luesebrink as Tanzmädchen
 Herbert Spalke as Radio Mann
 Charlie Kracker as Ein Dieb
 Günther Polensen as Polizeioffizier
 Hellmuth Passarge as Wachthabender
 Curd Jürgens as Hans Wellenkamp
 Lucy Millowitsch as Stimmungssängerin
 Horst Breitkopf as Ein Herr in besten Jahren
 Alfred Kiwitt as Ein Gast

See also
 L'Inconnue de la Seine

References

Bibliography

External links 
 

1936 films
1936 drama films
German drama films
Films of Nazi Germany
1930s German-language films
Films directed by Frank Wisbar
Films based on German novels
Terra Film films
German black-and-white films
1930s German films